Octave Lebesgue (5 November 1857, Paris – 24 April 1933, Paris) was a French journalist and writer. He is best known by the pseudonym Georges Montorgueil, though he also wrote as 'Jean Valjean' (after the protagonist of Les Misérables) and 'Caribert'. He also produced librettos for operas and musicals.

Beginning his career in Lyon, he later worked in Paris, notably on L'Écho de Paris. He contributed to the satirical weekly Le Courrier français. He rose to 'chef des informations' at L'Éclair and finally chief editor of Le Temps until his death. From 1900 onwards he edited L'Intermédiaire des chercheurs et curieux, a publication set up in 1864 to publish questions and answers on all subjects.

Sources
L'Intermédiaire des chercheurs et curieux. Octave Lebesgue

French librettists
19th-century French journalists
20th-century French journalists
Writers from Paris
French children's writers
1857 births
1933 deaths
French male non-fiction writers
Members of the Ligue de la patrie française